Admiral William Standley State Recreation Area is a state recreation area of California, United States, featuring  of redwoods on the Eel River. The park is a popular spot for salmon and steelhead fishing and also attracts hikers and picnickers.

The park is named for Admiral William Standley, who commanded the battleship California from 1926 to 1927 and later the United States battle fleet at San Pedro, Los Angeles, until appointed Chief of Naval Operations by President Franklin D. Roosevelt in 1933. After retiring in 1937, Standley was recalled to active duty in 1941 and served as United States ambassador to the Soviet Union from 1942 to 1943.

References

External links
Admiral William Standley State Recreation Area

California State Recreation Areas
Parks in Mendocino County, California
Protected areas established in 1944
1944 establishments in California